Hassan Al-Janabi (born 25 July 1983) is a Saudi Arabian handball player for Mudhar and the Saudi Arabian national team.

References

1983 births
Living people
Saudi Arabian male handball players
Handball players at the 2018 Asian Games
Asian Games competitors for Saudi Arabia
21st-century Saudi Arabian people
20th-century Saudi Arabian people